Tere Bina Kya Jeena  is a 1989 Bollywood film directed by P.P. Ghosh and starring Shekhar Suman, Moon Moon Sen, Satish Shah and Raj Kiran.

Plot

Cast
 Shekhar Suman as Amar
 Moon Moon Sen
 Satish Shah
 Raj Kiran

Soundtrack
Lyrics: Gulab Hussain

References

1980s Hindi-language films
Films scored by Jugal Kishore–Tilak Raj
1989 films